Little Things is a 2014 drama short film directed by Rati Tsiteladze and written by Nino Varsimashvili.

Synopsis
After the marriage Sophie realizes that once loving relationship with her husband, suddenly turns distant and decides to take action.

Crew
 Written by Nino Varsimashvili
 Cinematography by Roman Simonyan 
 Art direction by Olga Slusareva 
 Produced by Rati Tsiteladze and Roman Simonyan

Cast 
Nino Varsimashvili as Sophie
Rati Tsiteladze as Husband
Ivan Gridin as Delivery man

Reception
The film gained national and international recognition.

Awards and nominations

Official selection
The Tallinn Festival of New Cinema 2014 
Flagler Film Festival 
Highway 61 Film Festival 
5th Siliguri International Short Film and Documentary Contest 2014
Imphal International Film Festival 
On the Line Film Festival 
Eastern Breeze International Film Festival

References

External links
 
 
 

2014 films
2014 independent films
Drama films from Georgia (country)
2014 drama films
2010s English-language films